In rhetoric, parisosis occurs when clauses have very similar lengths, as measured by syllables.  It is sometimes taken as equivalent to isocolon.

An example of parisosis is:  I came, I saw, I conquered.

References

 

Rhetorical techniques